Abdel Fattah Sayed Ibrahim (born 3 February 1947) is an Egyptian former wrestler. He competed in the men's Greco-Roman 52 kg at the 1972 Summer Olympics.

References

External links
 

1947 births
Living people
Egyptian male sport wrestlers
Olympic wrestlers of Egypt
Wrestlers at the 1972 Summer Olympics
Place of birth missing (living people)
20th-century Egyptian people
21st-century Egyptian people